Fazilnagar is a constituency of the Uttar Pradesh Legislative Assembly covering the city of Fazilnagar in the Kushinagar district of Uttar Pradesh, India.

Fazilnagar is one of five assembly constituencies in the Deoria Lok Sabha constituency. Since 2008, this assembly constituency is numbered 332 amongst 403 constituencies.

Members of Legislative Assembly

Election results

2022

2017
Bharatiya Janta Party candidate Ganga Singh Kushwaha won in last Assembly election of 2017 Uttar Pradesh Legislative Elections, defeating Samajwadi Party candidate Vishwanath by a margin of 41,922 votes.

References

External links
 

Assembly constituencies of Uttar Pradesh
Kushinagar district